List of mesoregions of the State of São Paulo, Brazil, with their component microregions.

São José do Rio Preto

 Microregion of Auriflama
 Microregion of Catanduva
 Microregion of Fernandópolis
 Microregion of Jales
 Microregion of Nhandeara
 Microregion of Novo Horizonte
 Microregion of São José do Rio Preto
 Microregion of Votuporanga

Ribeirão Preto

 Microregion of Barretos
 Microregion of Batatais
 Microregion of Franca
 Microregion of Jaboticabal
 Microregion of Ribeirão Preto
 Microregion of São Joaquim da Barra

Araçatuba

 Microregion of Andradina
 Microregion of Araçatuba
 Microregion of Birigüi

Bauru

 Microregion of Avaré
 Microregion of Bauru
 Microregion of Botucatu
 Microregion of Jaú
 Microregion of Lins

Araraquara

 Microregion of Araraquara
 Microregion of São Carlos

Piracicaba

 Microregion of Limeira
 Microregion of Piracicaba
 Microregion of Rio Claro

Campinas

 Microregion of Amparo
 Microregion of Campinas
 Microregion of Mogi-Mirim
 Microregion of Pirassununga
 Microregion of São João da Boa Vista

Presidente Prudente

 Microregion of Adamantina
 Microregion of Dracena
 Microregion of Presidente Prudente

Marília

 Microregion of Marília
 Microregion of Tupã

Assis

 Microregion of Assis
 Microregion of Ourinhos

Itapetininga

 Microregion of Capão Bonito
 Microregion of Itapetininga
 Microregion of Itapeva
 Microregion of Tatuí

Macro Metropolitana Paulista

 Microregion of Bragança Paulista
 Microregion of Jundiaí
 Microregion of Piedade
 Microregion of Sorocaba

Vale do Paraíba Paulista

 Microregion of Bananal
 Microregion of Campos do Jordão
 Microregion of Caraguatatuba
 Microregion of Guaratinguetá
 Microregion of Paraibuna/Paraitinga
 Microregion of São José dos Campos

Litoral Sul Paulista

 Microregion of Itanhaém
 Microregion of Registro

Metropolitan São Paulo

 Microregion of Franco da Rocha
 Microregion of Guarulhos
 Microregion of Itapecerica da Serra
 Microregion of Mogi das Cruzes
 Microregion of Osasco
 Microregion of Santos
 Microregion of São Paulo

 
São Paulo (state)
Mesoregions